The Constitution is a 2016 Croatian drama film directed by Rajko Grlić, starring Nebojša Glogovac, Ksenija Marinković, Dejan Aćimović, and Božidar Smiljanić.

Plot
The film is a story of four people who live in the same apartment building in downtown Zagreb, but are wary of each other because they don't share the same ethnic and religious backgrounds and sexual preferences. Vjeko Kralj (Nebojša Glogovac), a high school professor and a transvestite, is beaten in the street by a group of hooligans. In the hospital, he accidentally meets his neighbor Maja Samardžić (Ksenija Marinković), who works there as a nurse. After Vjeko is released, she continues to look after him and his dying father. She then asks Vjeko to help her husband Ante (Dejan Aćimović), who is a police officer, to pass the Croatian Constitution exam. Problems soon arise because Ante is an ethnic Serb, while Vjeko is an ardent Croatian nationalist. Slowly and painfully, they begin to open and recognize each other as human beings.

Reception
The film won the Grand Prix des Amériques in 2016.

Sources

 Popularni beogradski glumac odabrao je Telegram za svoj prvi intervju o novom hrvatskom filmu

External links
 
 

2016 films
Croatian drama films
Films set in Zagreb
Films directed by Rajko Grlić
2016 drama films
Croatian LGBT-related films
LGBT-related drama films
2016 LGBT-related films